The following is an incomplete list of indoor arenas in Nordic countries whose capacity is at least 5,000.

Current arenas

See also
List of indoor arenas by capacity
List of indoor arenas in Europe

Indoor arenas
Nordic
Nordic countries